Janet Taylor Pickett (born August 13, 1948) is an American artist. Pickett's mixed media works are inspired by her life experience as an African American woman.

Early life and education

Janet Taylor Pickett was born in 1948 in Ann Arbor, Michigan where she earned both her bachelor's and master's degrees in fine art. She also studied art at the Vermont Studio Center, Parsons School of Design, and the Fashion Institute of Technology.

Career

Taylor Pickett works in various mediums including sculpture, installation, painting, assemblage, and collage. Her work is inspired by her life as an African American woman and informed by her 30 years teaching at Essex County College in New Jersey. In her own words, "My Blackness is a declarative statement in my work.”

Taylor Pickett was one of the artists whose work was exhibited in the 1986 group show Progressions: Cultural Legacy at MoMA PS1.

Kamala Harris is a patron of Taylor Pickett's work. One of the artist's pieces was displayed in the congressional office when Harris was a senator.

Notable exhibitions

Solo exhibitions
2021: Necessary Memories, Jennifer Baahng Gallery, New York, New York
2016: Janet Taylor Pickett: The Matisse Series, Montclair Art Museum, Montclair, New Jersey

Group shows
2020: Riffs and Relations: African American Artists and the European Modernist Tradition, The Phillips Collection, Washington DC
2017: African American Women Artists and the Power of Their Gaze, David C. Driskell Center For the Study of Visual Arts and Culture of African Americans and the African Diaspora, University of Maryland, Maryland  
1986: Progressions: A Cultural Legacy, Museum of Modern Art, New York, New York

Collections

"And She Was Born", mixed media, 2017, The Phillips Collection, Washington, D.C.
"Hagar's Dress", print, 2007, Studio Museum in Harlem, New York, New York, the Pennsylvania Academy of the Fine Arts, Philadelphia, Pennsylvania, and the Telfair Museums, Savannah, Georgia

References

External links

Live Interview with ARTnews President and Editorial Director Marion K. Manaker

1948 births
Artists from Pasadena, California
African-American women artists
African-American contemporary artists
American contemporary artists
21st-century American women artists
Artists from Ann Arbor, Michigan
University of Michigan alumni
Living people
21st-century African-American women
21st-century African-American artists
20th-century African-American people
20th-century African-American women